Obley, New South Wales located at 32°44′54″S 148°36′04″  is a hamlet of Cabonne Shire Council, New South Wales.

The village of Obley is on Obley Road where it crosses the Little River, a few miles west of Yeoval, New South Wales. A larger town was laid out but it never developed, due to the competition with nearby Yeoval which was on the railwayline.

References

Localities in New South Wales
Geography of New South Wales
Central West (New South Wales)